The Algiers Expedition of 1516 was an unsuccessful military campaign by the Spanish Empire and the Sheikh of Ténès to overthrow the Ottoman Regency of Algiers.

The previous sovereign of Algiers had been murdered by Hayreddin Barbarossa, who took power in Algiers. The Spanish, along with the Sheikh of Ténès, wanted to drive out Barbarossa and replace him with the son of the murdered prince. The expedition included 10,000 or 15,000 men along with 10,000 Moors from Ténès.  Barbarossa's forces included only 1,500 men. 

In 1516, the invading fleet set sail for Algiers.  However, a storm wrecked the fleet while in transit.  When the survivors reached Algiers, they were easily routed by Barbarossa's forces.

The Spaniards suffered casualties of 3,000 killed or wounded and 400 captured. In total 8,000 men were lost.  The Algerian forces had few casualties.

See also
Capture of Algiers (1516)
Algiers Expedition (1519)

References 

History of Algiers
Ottoman Algeria
16th century in Algiers
16th century in Algeria
Algiers